Heia Norge ("Go, Norway!") is a moniker in the newspaper Verdens Gang, Norway's largest newspaper from 1981 to 2010.

Its purpose has been to unveil and ridicule elements of Norwegian bureaucracy, laws and regulations not favored by Verdens Gang. The moniker has been used by active politicians who themselves have tried to point out unwanted regulations.

References

Mass media in Norway
Populism